Albert William Thompson (June 29, 1922- December 26, 2004) was an American politician and jurist for the state of Georgia. During World War II, Thompson served in North Africa and Europe with the 41st Combat Engineers. Receiving his undergraduate degree from Savannah State College in 1942 and his law degree from Howard University School of Law, he became the first African-American admitted to the bar in Columbus, Georgia in 1951.

In 1965 he became one of the first African-Americans elected to the Georgia House of Representatives, representing district 110–2 in Muscogee County. In 1974, he also became the first African-American chair of a Georgia House of Representatives committee, the House Special Judiciary Committee. In 1980 he was appointed a Superior Court Judge, again becoming the first African-American state-appointed judge in Georiga history, and retired in 1991 as an Administrative Law Judge. He died in 2004 and is buried at Riverdale Cemetery in Columbus.

References

1922 births
2004 deaths
African-American state legislators in Georgia (U.S. state)
Members of the Georgia House of Representatives
United States Army personnel of World War II
Savannah State University alumni
Howard University School of Law alumni
Georgia (U.S. state) lawyers
African Americans in World War II
African-American United States Army personnel